Bloor is a surname. Notable people with the surname include:
 Joseph Bloor (1789–1862), a developer of Toronto and founder of the village of Yorkville
 Bloor Street, a major thoroughfare in Toronto named after him
 Bloor or Line 2 Bloor–Danforth of the Toronto subway
 Bloor, Yonge, or Bloor-Yonge station on the Toronto subway
 Bloor streetcar line, a former line on the Toronto streetcar system
 Bloor GO Station, a commuter rail station in Toronto
 Bloor or Prince Edward Viaduct, Toronto
 Bloor Cinema, Toronto
 Bloor Collegiate Institute, Toronto
 Alan Bloor (born 1943), British footballer
 Amanda Bloor (born 1962), British Anglican priest
 David Bloor (born 1942), scholar in the sociology of scientific knowledge
 Edward Bloor (born 1950), American novelist
 Ella Reeve Bloor (1862–1951), political activist
 John Bloor (born 1943), British housebuilder and owner of the Triumph company
 James Bloor (actor), British actor
 Lewis Bloor (born 1989), British reality TV participant
 Micky Bloor, English footballer

Fictional characters:
 Manfred Bloor, a character in Jenny Nimmo's Children of the Red King fantasy novel series

See also
 Bloor Passage, a water passage in the Argentine Islands near Antarctica
 Ron Bloore, Canadian artist